Gdynia Pogórze is a PKP freight railway station in Gdynia (Pomeranian Voivodeship), Poland.

Lines crossing the station

References 
Gdynia Pogórze article at Polish Stations Database, URL accessed at 17 June 2006

Pogorze